State of the Art is the fifth studio album released by Australian hip hop trio, Hilltop Hoods, on 12 June 2009.

At the ARIA Music Awards of 2009, the album won ARIA Award for Best Urban Album while Suffa won ARIA Award for Engineer of the Year for this release.

At the J Awards of 2009, the album was nominated for Australian Album of the Year.

Background
State of the Art is the first release by their newly founded record label, Golden Era Records. It is the first release to be made by the group since their ARIA Award winning album, The Hard Road, in 2006, and its remix album, The Hard Road: Restrung, which was released in 2007. These albums were both released under their previous label Obese Records. The first track on the album, 'The Return' is about how long it had been since they last released an album. 

The album contains 3 singles, first single "Chase That Feeling", was released on 8 May 2009. The other two singles "Still Standing" and "The Light You Burned" were released with the album on 12 June 2009, then re-released with remix, instrumental and radio edited versions of the songs a few months after their initial release. There are 12 tracks in the album, and 2 extra bonus tracks. Several tracks contain features from Trials, Pharoahe Monch,  and several members of the Adelaide Symphony Orchestra. Other acts that also appear on the album are Briggs, Funkoars and Vents, who are also signed to Golden Era Records and appear on the iTunes bonus track 'Rent Week'.

Similar to previous releases by the group, 'State of the Art' features sound samples taken from a variety of sources. The influences of this album are both retro and contemporary, featuring soundbites taken from songs and films from 1969 to 2008. 

The album debuted at number one on the Australian ARIA Charts and has been certified double platinum by the Australian Recording Industry Association (ARIA) for shipments exceeding 140,000 copies. In 2020 the album was certified triple platinum after shipments of State of the Art exceeded 210, 000 copies.

Artwork 
State of the Art is the 4th studio album to feature the character of 'Armageddon' on the cover, a creation of Hilltop Hoods to adorn their albums. The trio consider him to be the 4th member of the band, and said they were inspired in their youth to create him by Iron Maiden's popular character 'Eddie'.

The illustration for the album and associated releases was provided by John Engelhardt, and graphic design provided by April77 Creative. Associated Photography release with the album was created by Mathematics & Conan Whitehouse, and image post production services were provided by Ben Funnel.

Sampling 
State of the Art, like many Hilltop Hoods releases, feature sounds samples from a variety of sources. 

'She's So Ugly' was sampled in Briggs' 2011 track 'Let it Burn'.

Reception 

State of the Art spent two weeks at number one in the ARIA charts after it was released on 12 June 2009. After dropping from the number one spot, State of the Art spent a total of 28 weeks within the ARIA top 50 albums Charts. After its initial 21 week streak, the album left the top 50 for seven weeks, then placed on and off over the next five weeks. The album took an almost 10 year hiatus from the top 50 album charts, but returned for a single week at position #41 in December 2019. 

State of the Art was also number one on the Weekly Top Urban Album Chart for three weeks (22 June – 6 July).  It finished at number 12 in the Yearly ARIA Top 25 Albums Chart, the band's first album to be included in this chart. The album was certified double platinum in 2010 for shipping 140,000 units and ended up being certified triple platinum in 2020.

"Chase That Feeling", the first single from the album, was released on the 5 May and peaked at number eight in the weekly ARIA top 50 Singles Charts. It remained in the top 50 for 28 weeks. "Still Standing", the second single from State of the Art, and was released with the album on 12 June 2009. It peaked at number 34 in the ARIA Top Weekly Singles Charts, and spent six weeks in the top 50. 

'Chase That Feeling' came in at number 3 in Triple J's Hottest 100, behind 'Little Lion Man' by Mumford and Sons (number 1) and 'Parle Vous Francais' by Art vs. Science (number 2). 'Still Standing' placed at 37, making them one of 23 artist to receive at least 2 songs nominations in the 100. 'Chase That Feeling' was also selected with 41 other songs from the 100 to be released in Triple j Hottest 100 Volume 17 CD, representing the countdown of that year. The song features as track 6 in disc 1 of the CD release. 

When ‘Chase That Feeling’ placed 3rd, they tied the record for highest placed hip hop song in the hottest 100 with 3 other songs. Their own song ‘The Hard Road’ placed 3rd in 2006, as did the Gorillaz ‘Feel Good Inc.’ in 2005, and Coolio’s 'Gangsta's Paradise' in 1995. This tied record was broken in 2012 when ‘Thrift Shop’ by Macklemore and Ryan Lewis featuring Wanz placed number 1.

Track listing

Touring
Hilltop Hoods promoted their album with their 'State of the Art' tour, with support act Canadian hip hop artist Classified, and Australian rapper Briggs.

Following this tour, Hilltop Hoods launched a second national tour to promote their album. This was the 'Still Standing' tour supported by fellow Golden Era Records artist Vents and their mixer Dj ADFU.

The band also played songs from the new album at shows performed at festivals throughout 2009.

Charts

Weekly charts

Year-end charts

Certifications

References

2009 albums
ARIA Award-winning albums
Hilltop Hoods albums
Golden Era Records albums